Roger Frontenac was a French navy officer and a scholar of Nostradamus' prophecies. He proposed an interpretation system for the text of Les Propheties, based upon a form of cryptography known as the Vigenère table.

Biography 
Roger Frontenac, as a navy officer, was in charge of military ciphers. After World War II, he began to study the work of Nostradamus, treating it as any other message from an enemy. He searched for any hint about decoding methods. The name of Nostradamus' son Cesar led Frontenac to suspect the use of a Caesar cipher.

His maiden work: La clef secrète de Nostradamus 
He published his treatise about Nostradamus' letters and works, La clef secrète de Nostradamus (The Secret Key of Nostradamus). In the book, Frontenac professed his belief in Nostradamus as a true prophet, who made correct foretellings, and that the centuries (in French Les Propheties) contained true predictions about future events until the year 3797.

But, he contended that those predictions were hidden and mixed, and not made understandable before events occurred. His conclusions were based on a combination of several cryptographic methods, including a systematic alteration in the metrical order of quatrains' texts.  This process was inspired by Nostradamus' use of the expression rabouter obscurément ("to mix in order to make them obscure") in a letter.

The systematic reordering of quatrains, according to Frontenac, could be achieved using a couple of combined keys, and he stated that he managed to find the first key (a typical Vigenère text, easy to hold in memory), that was the Latin phrase:

See also 
 Cryptography
 Kabbalah
 Nostradamus
 Prophecy
 Vaticinia Nostradami
 Vigenère cypher

References

Bibliography 
Frontenac, Roger, La clef secrète de Nostradamus, Les Editions Denoel, Paris 1950

External links 
  La chiave di Frontenac
  Website by Cesare Ottavio Ramotti

French non-fiction writers
French cryptographers
Nostradamus
Year of birth missing
Year of death missing
French male writers
Male non-fiction writers